, provisional designation , is a trans-Neptunian object and cubewano from the Kuiper belt, located in the outermost region of the Solar System. It was discovered on 13 March 2011, by astronomers with the Pan-STARRS survey at Haleakala Observatory, Hawaii, United States.

Orbit and classification 

 is a cubewano, a classical, low-eccentricity object in the Kuiper belt, located in between the two resonant plutino and twotino populations, and belongs to the "stirred" hot population rather than to the cold population with low inclinations.

It orbits the Sun at a distance of 38.7–53.7 AU once every 313 years and 8 months (114,565 days; semi-major axis of 46.16 AU). Its orbit has an eccentricity of 0.16 and an inclination of 9° with respect to the ecliptic.

Numbering and naming 

This minor planet was numbered by the Minor Planet Center on 25 September 2018 and received the number  in the minor planet catalog. As of 2018, it has not been named.

Physical characteristics 

According to the American astronomer Michael Brown,  measures 343 kilometers in diameter based on an assumed albedo of 0.08. On his website, Michael Brown lists this object as a "possible" dwarf planet (200–400 km), which is the category with the lowest certainty in his 5-class taxonomic system. Similarly, Johnston's archive estimates a diameter 321 kilometers using an albedo of 0.09. As of 2018, neither a spectral type or the color indices have been determined, nor a rotational lightcurve has been obtained from spectroscopic and photometric observations. The body's color, rotation period, pole and shape remain unknown.

References

External links 
 List of Transneptunian Objects, Minor Planet Center
 M.P.E.C. statistics for F51 – All MPECs
 Discovery Circumstances: Numbered Minor Planets (520001)-(525000) – Minor Planet Center
 
 

523684
523684
523684
20110313